The Taiwan Sugar Museum is a museum about sugar in East District, Tainan, Taiwan.

Transportation
The museum is accessible south from Tainan Station of the Taiwan Railways.

See also
 List of museums in Taiwan
 Taiwan Sugar Museum (Kaohsiung)

References

East District, Tainan
Museums with year of establishment missing
Food museums in Taiwan
Museums in Tainan
Sugar museums